Albirex Niigata Phnom Penh FC, was a football (soccer) club in  Cambodia. It competed in the Cambodian League, the top division of Cambodian football.

Satellite clubs

The following clubs are affiliated with Albirex Niigata FC (Cambodia):

  Albirex Niigata (J1 League)
  Japan Soccer College (Hokushinetsu Football League)
  Albirex Niigata Ladies (Japan Women's Football League)
  Albirex Niigata Singapore FC (S.League)
  Albirex Niigata Barcelona (Quarta Catalana)

Squad 2014 

 16px

External links 
 
 Goal.com Report on clubs foundation and goal

Football clubs in Cambodia
Sport in Phnom Penh